Razzy Dazzy Spasm Band may refer to:
 Razzy Dazzy Spasm Band (folk), a 1970s folk/bluegrass band
 Razzy Dazzy Spasm Band (jazz), an 1890s New Orleans jazz band